The 2016 Four National Figure Skating Championships included the Czech Republic, Slovakia, Poland, and Hungary. The event was held in December 2015 in Třinec, Czech Republic. Skaters comped in the disciplines of men's singles, ladies' singles, pair skating, and ice dancing.

The results were split by country; the three highest-placing skaters from each country formed their national podiums. The results were among the criteria used to determine international assignments. It was the eighth consecutive season that the Czech Republic, Slovakia, and Poland held their national championships together and the third season that Hungary participated.

Medals summary

Czech Republic

Slovakia

Poland

Hungary

Senior results

Men

Ladies

Pairs

Ice dancing

References

External links
 2016 Four National Championships results

Four National Figure Skating Championships
Four National Figure Skating Championships
Four National Figure Skating Championships
Four National Figure Skating Championships
Four National Figure Skating Championships
Czech Figure Skating Championships
Slovak Figure Skating Championships
Polish Figure Skating Championships
Hungarian Figure Skating Championships

pl:Mistrzostwa Polski w Łyżwiarstwie Figurowym 2016